The Romanian Civil Aeronautical Authority (RCAA, AACR) is the civil aviation authority of Romania. Its head office is in Bucharest.

References

External links
 Romanian Civil Aeronautical Authority
 Romanian Civil Aeronautical Authority 
 
Civil Aeronautical Authority
Civil Aeronautical Authority
Civil Aeronautical Authority
Romania
Transport organizations based in Romania